Boris Becker was the defending champion, but did not compete this year.

Michael Stich won the title by defeating Thomas Enqvist 6–7(7–9), 7–6(7–4), 6–2 in the final.

Seeds

Draw

Finals

Top half

Bottom half

References

External links
 Official results archive (ATP)
 Official results archive (ITF)

Los Angeles Open (tennis)
1995 ATP Tour
Volvo Tennis Los Angeles
Volvo Tennis Los Angeles